Jari Grönstrand (born November 14, 1962 in Tampere, Finland) is a retired professional ice hockey player who played in the National Hockey League and SM-liiga. He played for Tappara, Minnesota North Stars, New York Rangers, New York Islanders, and Quebec Nordiques.

Career statistics

External links 

1962 births
Living people
Capital District Islanders players
Chamonix HC players
Finnish ice hockey defencemen
Halifax Citadels players
Hockey Club de Reims players
Ice hockey people from Tampere
Lausitzer Füchse players
Minnesota North Stars draft picks
Minnesota North Stars players
New York Rangers players
New York Islanders players
Quebec Nordiques players
Springfield Indians players
Tappara players
Toronto Maple Leafs scouts
20th-century Finnish people